Alexander Nyarko (born 15 October 1973) is a Ghanaian former professional footballer who played as a midfielder.

Club career
Nyarko started his career in Ghana, and in 1995 he joined FC Basel from Sportul Studenţesc.

Nyarko joined FC Basel for their 1995–96 season under head coach Claude Andrey. He played his debut for his new club in the home game in the St. Jakob Stadium the 1995 UEFA Intertoto Cup match on 8 July 1995 as Basel were beaten 3–2 by Karlsruher SC. After playing one test game and another UEFA Intertoto Cup match, he played his domestic league debut for the team in the home game on 19 July as Basel won 2–1 against Sion. He scored his first goal for the team on 5 November in the away game in the Cornaredo Stadium against Lugano. It was the only goal of the game as Basel won 1–0. He played for the team for two seasons and during this time Nyarko played a total of 83 games for Basel scoring a total of 15 goals. 55 of these games were in the Nationalliga A, six in the Swiss Cup, five in the UEFA Intertoto Cup and 17 were friendly games. He scored eight goals in the domestic league, two in the cup, one in the UIC and the other four were scored during the test games.

He then moved to Karlsruher SC in Germany and then two seasons for RC Lens in France. While at Lens he played as a substitute in the final as they won the 1998–99 Coupe de la Ligue.

In 2000 he joined Everton F.C. for £4.5 million, signing a contract until June 2005. He scored his first and only goal for Everton against Tottenham Hotspur in September 2000. He is infamous for an incident during the 2000–01 season where during a game against Arsenal a fan came on the pitch and offered him his own royal blue Everton shirt, signalling that Nyarko was not good enough to wear the colours of Everton. After the fan was escorted away by police, Nyarko requested to be substituted and transferred.

Eventually, he went on loan to French club AS Monaco just days later for the rest of the season, and then had a loan spell at Paris Saint-Germain for the entire 2002–03 season. Nyarko returned to Everton for the 2003–04 season and made his return to the first team in a League Cup tie against Charlton Athletic. A few days later he made his first league appearance of the season against Chelsea and almost gave Everton the lead but his shot came back off the crossbar. He went on to make 11 league appearances for the Merseyside club that season, but was released after the season because his work permit expired and could not be renewed.

Nyarko then spent six months out of football, before joining IK Start in March 2005. He was, however, released by the club after an unauthorized trip to his family in Switzerland. Nyarko joined Swiss team Yverdon Sport FC in June 2006. He was released again in December 2007 and retired.

International career
Nyarko was capped for Ghanaian Olympic team at 1992 Summer Olympics, and won a bronze medal. He also played for Ghana in 1998 and 2000 Africa Cup of Nations.

Honours
Lens
 Coupe de la Ligue: 1998–99

References

External links
 
 
 Alex Nyarko at Hattrick.ch 
 
 
 
 
 

1973 births
Living people
Association football midfielders
Ghanaian footballers
Ghana international footballers
Footballers at the 1992 Summer Olympics
Olympic footballers of Ghana
Olympic bronze medalists for Ghana
1998 African Cup of Nations players
2000 African Cup of Nations players
Olympic medalists in football
Medalists at the 1992 Summer Olympics
Asante Kotoko S.C. players
Dawu Youngstars players
FC Sportul Studențesc București players
FC Basel players
Karlsruher SC players
RC Lens players
Everton F.C. players
AS Monaco FC players
Paris Saint-Germain F.C. players
IK Start players
Yverdon-Sport FC players
Liga I players
Bundesliga players
Premier League players
Ligue 1 players
Swiss Super League players
Ghanaian expatriate footballers
Ghanaian expatriate sportspeople in Romania
Expatriate footballers in Romania
Ghanaian expatriate sportspeople in Germany
Expatriate footballers in Germany
Ghanaian expatriate sportspeople in Switzerland
Expatriate footballers in Switzerland
Ghanaian expatriate sportspeople in France
Expatriate footballers in France
Ghanaian expatriate sportspeople in England
Expatriate footballers in England
Ghanaian expatriate sportspeople in Monaco
Expatriate footballers in Monaco
Ghanaian expatriate sportspeople in Norway
Expatriate footballers in Norway